Three Worlds can refer to:

 Popper's three worlds, an ontological framework by Karl Popper
 Three Worlds (Escher), a print by M. C. Escher
 Three Worlds (book), an 1877 religious book
 Three Worlds (film), a 2012 French film
 Three Worlds Theory, the Maoist concept
 Three-world model, the western political concept

See also
 Trailokya, the use of this term in Hinduism and Buddhism